Mount Vernon African Methodist Episcopal Church is a historic church at 913 East Calhoun Street in Palestine, Texas.  It is the third oldest AME church in Texas.  The church was organized by freedmen in the early 1870s.  The congregation originally worshiped at a church that it shared with Missionary Baptist Church.  In 1878 the church bought 2.2 acres at its present location and constructed a wood-frame structure in 1885.  In 1921 the structure was razed and a new church designed in a Gothic vernacular style was built.  The church's two front bell towers are typical of the AME faith-based churches of the 1920s.  Mount Vernon was the first church to introduce Palestine to integrated low-income apartment housing.  In 1968 a 100-unit apartment housing project was erected at 2020 Sterne Avenue. In 1986 the church was designated a Recorded Texas Historic Landmark.

In 1988 it was placed on the National Register of Historic Places.

The church closed its doors in 2014.  In 2015, Mount Vernon was placed on Preservation Texas' Most Endangered places list.

The building is brick with Gothic Revival details.

See also

National Register of Historic Places listings in Anderson County, Texas
Recorded Texas Historic Landmarks in Anderson County

References

External links

African Methodist Episcopal churches in Texas
Churches on the National Register of Historic Places in Texas
Gothic Revival church buildings in Texas
Churches completed in 1921
20th-century Methodist church buildings in the United States
Churches in Anderson County, Texas
National Register of Historic Places in Anderson County, Texas
Recorded Texas Historic Landmarks